Barkheda is a town in BHEL township, Bhopal which is a city in Madhya Pradesh.

Etymology
Barkheda in Hindi means the big ravine.

Schools
 St. Xavier's Senior Secondary School

Neighbourhoods in Bhopal